Tomorrows Bad Seeds, commonly abbreviated TBS, is an American reggae rock band made up of 4 musicians from Hermosa Beach, California. The band's line-up consists of Moises Juarez (lead vocals), Matthew McEwan (vocals/guitar), Pat Salmon (drums), and Andre Davis (bass).

History
Tomorrows Bad Seeds was formed by lead singer Moises Juarez and guitar player and turntablist Mathew McEwan in Hermosa Beach, California in 2004. Later, Johnny McEwan, Mat's cousin, joined the band as their drummer.  The band's original bass player was Al Arnado, and Andre Davis was recruited as his replacement when he left the band. Sean Chapman, a high school classmate of other members of the band, was added later as a guitar player and backing vocalist.

The band's name came from a graffiti crew they had grown up around called TBS, they used the acronym to come up with Tomorrows Bad Seeds as a reflection of their roots.  The band released their debut album Early Prayers in June 2007 on the independent label UrbanTone Records, featuring the singles Rhyme & Reason, Vices, Warrior Poet and Love Street,. In 2007 the band toured all over Hawaii on four separate tours throughout Kona and Hilo. The response was mixed. In 2009 Tomorrows Bad Seeds covered the United States playing at venues like House of Blues (Hollywood), Vault 350, Knitting Factory, Key Club, Galaxy Theatre, the world-famous Roxy Theatre.

In 2009, during the recording of TBS' second album, Johnny McEwan left the band and was replaced by Andre's friend Pat Salmon. On May 25, 2010, Tomorrows Bad Seeds released their second album Sacred For Sale. Following the CD release of their second album the band was added on to Warped Tour 2010 and played on the Skullcandy stage. On August 18, 2010 the band closed the Roxy Theatre portion of the Sunset Music Festival.  They then co-headlined a tour with Passafire. On November 18, 2010 Tomorrows Bad Seeds were honored with the Commercial Success Award at the Los Angeles Music Awards for having reached over 150,000 downloads for the 2010 year.

On December 2, 2010, Tomorrows Bad Seeds began their Holidaze Acoustic Tour of California, each show was a one of a kind performance, providing a different line up of TBS hits. The band closed 2010 on New Year's Eve with a headlining show @ BriXton in Redondo Beach, California. On January 9 and 10, 2011 the band filmed their first music video for “Reflect”.  Two days later on January 12, 2011 Tomorrows Bad Seeds filmed a national T.V. performance for The Late Late Show with Craig Ferguson which aired March 3, 2011, they performed "Only For You" from their second album "Sacred For Sale."

On August 8, 2011 the band released their single "Nice & Slow". This single charted as number 1 on CDbaby Reggae chart upon release. TBS worked with their sponsor Body Glove to create a summer-themed video to accompany the new single. The "Nice & Slow video won MTVU Video Of The Week and was added to rotation on October 14, 2011. On November 29, 2011 TBS began recording their third album "The Great Escape" with Grammy Award winner and seven-time nominee Damon Elliott at the Village Studios. Their first single from the album, "One Way", co-written with Tim Myers (formerly of OneRepublic), made the Billboard Indicator Charts.

Changes
In 2014 Moi, Sean & Mets started a side project called LIFE

In January 2017 Sean Chapman left the band to pursue a solo production and songwriting career.
In the same month of 2017 Urbantone Records released the band from its contract allowing the Band to sign with a new label
Island/Empire Records.

Music style and influence
Since most of the group grew up in the South Bay, they were highly influenced by the reggae, rock, punk culture and bands like Sublime, Pepper, Pennywise among others.   After releasing both records TBS has established the band's sound as a fusion of rock, reggae, ska punk, surf rock, hip hop and blues.

Band members
 Moises Juarez – lead vocals
 Mathew McEwan – vocals/guitar
 Pat Salmon – drums
 Andre Davis – bass

Former band members
 Johhny McEwan
 Al Arnado
 Sean Chapman

Discography
Albums
 Early Prayers - 2007
 Sacred for Sale - 2010
 The Great Escape - 2012
 Illuminate - 2018

EPs
   "V"  2013

Singles
 "Nice & Slow" - 2011
 "Warrior Poet" (DubStep) - 2011
 "One Way" - 2012
 "Trinity" - 2018

Television Appearances
March 3, 2011– The Late Late Show with Craig Ferguson on CBS

References

External links
 Official website

American reggae musical groups
Reggae rock groups